Ceuthophilus stygius, known generally as the Kentucky cave cricket or cave camel cricket, is a species of camel cricket in the family Rhaphidophoridae. It is found in North America.

References

Further reading

External links

 

stygius
Insects described in 1861